A candy pumpkin is a small, pumpkin-shaped, mellow crème confection primarily made from corn syrup, honey, carnauba wax, chocolate, and sugar. Traditionally colored with an orange base and topped with a green stem to make candy pumpkins largely identifiable with Halloween, a candy pumpkin is considered a mellow crème by confectioners since the candy has a marshmallow flavor. Sometimes called candy corn's first cousin, candy pumpkins are made through a starch casting process similar to that for candy corn. Brach's candy pumpkin, known by the trademarked name Pumpkin "®" is the most popular candy pumpkin. Brach's Confections is now owned by Ferrara Candy Company.

History
Candy pumpkins are made using a similar process to make candy corn. The candy corn process and product were created by George Renninger of the Wunderlee Candy Co. in the 1880s and became popular as a treat in the 1920s. Candy pumpkins first were produced in mid 20th century using a process similar to that of candy corn. Corn syrup, food coloring, honey, and sugar are beaten and heated in large kettles to produce an ultra-sweet syrup. This syrupy mix generically is called "mellow crème" by confectioners, since the resulting candy has a mellow, creamy texture. The mellow crème slurry then was divided into two uneven amounts, with the large amount receiving orange food coloring and the smaller receiving green food coloring. A mogul machine brings the two colored mixtures together into a mold made of cornstarch, and the assembly is sent to a separate drying room to dry for 24 to 36 hours. Once dry, the candy is shaken violently to remove excess cornstarch and a final glaze is added to give the candy pumpkin a sheen. Candy pumpkins, acorns and other shapes that are derived from the mellow crème mixture are often sold with candy corn under the name "harvest mix."

Impact
Candy pumpkins are popular in part because of its "interesting texture." As of 1988, most big confectionery companies, including Mars Inc., did not market special Halloween candies. The one exception was Brach's Confections, which made candy pumpkins among other seasonal products. Their "Mellow crème Pumpkin" was made to look like an autumnal fruit; each pumpkin contained 25 calories and 5 grams sugar. In 1992, Brach's Confections expected to sell more than 30 million pounds of mellow crème candy during the fall season, which included its seasonal mellow crème pumpkins. 

By the late 1990s, competitors of Brach's realized that the market for the special Halloween candy pumpkin was expanding. For example, in 1997, candy pumpkins and other mellow crème candies helped push annual spending on Halloween candy in the United States to an estimated $950 million a year. In response, Mars, Inc. came out with Snickers Crème Pumpkin in 1998. The milk chocolate-covered peanut and caramel candy was packaged in a 1.20 oz. size with a plastic wrapper featuring a jack-o-lantern on the package. At the time, the Snickers Crème Pumpkin retailed for 50 U.S. cents. Two years later, in 2000, Frankford Candy & Chocolate Company cross-licensed with ConAgra Foods to produce Peter Pan Peanut Butter Pumpkins. Peter Pan Peanut Butter Pumpkins included a "rich and creamy" Peter Pan peanut butter center pressed into a detailed pumpkin mold. At that time, the Peter Pan pumpkin candy was sold in 14 oz. bags. Also in 2000, Zachary Confections expanded its product line to include candy pumpkins.

In addition to helping characterize Halloween, candy pumpkins played a role in the current U.S. implementation of daylight saving time. Since the 1960s, candy makers had wanted to get the trick-or-treat period covered by Daylight Saving, reasoning that if children have an extra hour of daylight, they would collect more candy. During the 1985 U.S Congressional hearings on Daylight Saving, the industry went so far as to put candy pumpkins on the seat of every senator, hoping to win a little favor. On July 8, 1986, President Ronald Reagan signed the Federal Fire Prevention and Control Act of 1986 into law; it contained a daylight saving rider which continued daylight saving time until the early morning of last Sunday in October; this did not include Halloween night. In 2005, daylight saving time was extended to the first Sunday in November—just long enough to include Halloween.

See also

Candy corn

References

Confectionery
Halloween food